The Abasuba Community Peace Museum  was founded in 2000, and is located in Ramba, Waware, Suba North District, Homa Bay County, Kenya. It is one of several peace museums throughout Kenya.

The Abasuba community Peace museum has stff within the rock art sites. The museum is also a research centre for students, doctors and professors and other related intellectuals wishing to study archaeological sites of the Lake Victoria region.

Rock art heritage has posed special challenges in attracting attention and visitors. These include inaccessible and unrecorded sites, little research or information and lack of protection against vandalism, and uncontrolled tourism. Managed tourism in the Suba District has the potential to create jobs and have a positive impact on the local economy. This helps to improve the pride and unique heritage found at the area.

In 2007, TARA received a grant from the Kenyan Tourism Trust Fund (TTF) to increase awareness of rock art, to promote rock art for tourism and to conserve and develop sites in a way that will lead to improving the quality of life in Suba District and expand the museum's reach. As a result, a larger museum opened in 2008.

Governing structure
The Abasuba Community Peace Museum is managed by the Curator, and overseen by board members representing the various communities in Suba District.

References

2000 establishments in Kenya
Museums established in 2000
Museums in Kenya
Ethnographic museums in Africa
Homa Bay County